Jankowo Gdańskie is a suburbian village in Gmina Kolbudy, near Gdańsk.

The village has a population of 983.

History
 
The first record of the village existing is from 1315 when bishop Gerard travelled to the village and paid his tithes to the Benedictines from there, where it was documented. Next, it was mentioned in the 16th century, where Konstantyn Ferber inherited the land after his father. 

In the late 18th century Jankowo was owned by Carol Frederick von Conradi, which had no children, and in order to leave a sign of his ownership behind, he created a research institute — Conradinum. The school was transformed into an Adolf Hitler School during World War 2.

References

Villages in Gdańsk County